Make It Hot is a 1998 album by Nicole Wray.

Make It Hot may also refer to:

 "Make It Hot" (Nicole Wray song), 1998
 "Make It Hot" (VS song), 2004
 "Make It Hot", a song by JDiggz from Memoirs of a Playbwoy
 "Make It Hot", a song by Kottonmouth Kings from Kottonmouth Kings
 "Make It Hot", a song by LL Cool J from Mr. Smith
 "Make It Hot", a song by Mirah from Advisory Committee
 "Make It Hot", a song by Major Lazer and Anitta, 2019